The Fairy King of Ar (originally released as Beings) is a 1998 British direct-to-video fantasy adventure film co-written, co-produced and directed by Paul Matthews. It stars Corbin Bernsen, Glynis Barber and Malcolm McDowell.

Plot
Since as far back as Kyle and Evie Preston can remember, their grandmother told fantastical tales about fairies who had been trapped underground by giants for thousands of years. Now their grandmother is gone, and the siblings are surprised to discover that she has left them a decrepit gold mine and a family home they never even knew existed. Upon discovering that grandmother's far-fetched stories have a bizarre basis in reality, and that by freeing the fairies from the mine they will discover a cure for their terminally ill father, Kyle and Evie race against time to free the trapped fairies and save their father's life.

Cast
 Corbin Bernsen as Rob Preston
 Glynis Barber as Nancy Preston
 Jameson Baltes as Kyle Preston
 Brittney Bomann as Evie
 Malcolm McDowell as Ian
 Leigh Greyvenstein as Tumbeleen
 Anne Curteis as Elizabeth Ballaugh

Reception
Andy Giese writing for the "Tofu Nerdpunk" praised McDowell's performance, but criticized the CGI and the special effects. Edwin L. Carpenter writing for the Christian website The Dove Foundation called the film "a delight for both kids and adults".

References

External links
 
 

1998 direct-to-video films
1998 films
1990s fantasy adventure films
British direct-to-video films
British fantasy adventure films
Films about fairies and sprites
1990s English-language films
Films directed by Paul Matthews
1990s British films